Thomas Joseph Carr (10 May 1839 – 6 May 1917) was the second Roman Catholic archbishop of Melbourne, Australia.

Early life
Carr was born near Moylough, Galway, Ireland, and educated at St Jarlath's College, Tuam, and at St Patrick's College, Maynooth. He was ordained on 19 May 1866, was a curate for six years, and was then appointed dean of the Dunboyne establishment of Maynooth. In 1874 he was elected to the vacant chair of theology and in 1880 he became vice-president of Maynooth and editor of the Irish Ecclesiastical Record, which he conducted with success. In 1883 he was made bishop of Galway, was consecrated on 26 August of that year, and three years later, almost to the day, was appointed Archbishop of Melbourne. He arrived in Melbourne on 11 June 1887.

Archbishop of Melbourne
One of the first problems brought before Carr was the question of education. The education act of the period had been framed for the purpose of training children in State schools without regard to sectarian differences. The new archbishop lost no time in urging that there could be no true education without a religious basis, and that it was not just that his co-religionists should be taxed to support a system of education that their conscience would not permit them to use. During his episcopacy of almost 30 years there was no wavering from this position, but no government could be prevailed on to take up this cause. In the circumstances it was felt that every effort would have to be made to extend the Catholic schools, and in the first 20 years considerable progress was made. Between 1887 and 1907 the number of primary schools increased from 75 to 108, and the pupils from 12,000 to 24,000. Even greater progress followed, as by 1916 the number of students was nearing 30,000 and in addition there were 37 colleges and high schools with 4751 pupils. The founding of an affiliated college at the University of Melbourne was another project very near to Carr's heart. He saw the foundation stone of Newman College laid, but did not live to see its completion.

Another important work was the completion of St Patrick's Cathedral, Melbourne. When Carr came work had been in progress for some 30 years but much remained to be done. In March 1890 he brought the question before a small gathering and almost at once £10,000 was promised. At a general meeting held on 20 April 1890 this amount was doubled. Soon after a contract for £42,000 was signed, but the bursting of the land boom and the failure of many financial institutions made it impossible for any of the subscribers to carry out their promises. The archbishop travelled the country and met with a ready response, a cathedral fair was held at the Royal Exhibition Building, Melbourne, which in four weeks yielded £11,000, and by one way and another the crisis was surmounted. The building, save one tower and the spires, was completed free from debt, and on 31 October 1897 was solemnly and impressively consecrated.

Between 1893 and 1897 Carr on more than one occasion was drawn into controversy with representatives of the Church of England and the Reverend John Laurence Rentoul of the Presbyterian Church. He conducted his case with courtesy, dignity and ability. When he allowed himself to be nominated for a seat on the council of the University of Melbourne, sufficient prejudice was left from old unhappy far off things to prevent his election. In April 1898 Carr visited Europe and returned in July 1899. In that year he took over the publication of the monthly journal Austral Light, and in 1907 was begun the long series of tracts published by the Australian Catholic Truth Society. To this society was entrusted the collection and publication of Carr's writings on controversial subjects, which appeared in 1907 in a volume of about 800 pages, under the title Lectures and Replies. In August 1908 he visited Rome and not long after his return he asked that a coadjutor might be appointed. In 1913, Daniel Mannix was given this position and thenceforth Carr took less part in the direction of the affairs of the diocese.

Carr died at Melbourne on 6 May 1917 and was buried in St Patrick's Cathedral, Melbourne.

Legacy
Carr was slightly over medium height and in his later years was heavily built. Tom Roberts, the artist, said he had the "typical head of a prelate". Roberts, who was not of his church, records that "speaking of the frailties and sins of people, he said he had never met a thoroughly bad man or woman... He's a man you could tell anything to-except something trumpery."

St. Patrick's Cathedral, Melbourne was his largest accomplishment, but there are many other markers to Carr's lasting contributions, including the parish of Werribee, Victoria, which he established in 1906. In the south-western Melbourne suburb of Tarneit, Thomas Carr College is named in his honour.

References

Further reading

External links
Image of Thomas Joseph Carr  at the State Library of Victoria.
History of Chaplaincy in the Australian Defence Force, 1901 to 1945
St Patrick’s Cathedral The Archbishops of Melbourne by Dean W.J. McCarthy
Thomas Carr College, Werribee
Thomas Carr Centre, Archbishopric of Melbourne

1839 births
1917 deaths
Alumni of St Patrick's College, Maynooth
Academics of St Patrick's College, Maynooth
Burials at St Patrick's Cathedral, Melbourne
19th-century Roman Catholic bishops in Ireland
People educated at St Jarlath's College
People from County Galway
Religious leaders from Melbourne
Roman Catholic bishops of Galway, Kilmacduagh and Kilfenora
Roman Catholic archbishops of Melbourne
19th-century Roman Catholic archbishops in Australia
20th-century Roman Catholic archbishops in Australia
Irish expatriate Roman Catholic archbishops
Irish emigrants to colonial Australia
Roman Catholic bishops of the Catholic Military Ordinariate of Australia